Angela Borsuk (born 29 August 1967) is an Israeli chess player. She previously represented Soviet Union and Ukraine. Borsuk was born in Kherson, Ukraine and made her chess debut for Ukraine in 1989. Borsuk has formally represented Israel for most number of times in her chess career. 

Angela Borsuk made her Israeli debut for the Israeli national chess team at the European Chess Championship in 1999, and received there a silver medal for her individual score. She again participated for Israel at this tournament in 2005, 2007, 2009, 2011 en 2013.

See also 
 List of female chess players

References

External links 
 
 Angela Borsuk chess games at 365Chess.com
 
 Angela Borsuk chess games and profile at Chess-DB.com

1967 births
Living people
Chess International Masters
Chess woman grandmasters
Soviet female chess players
Israeli female chess players
Ukrainian female chess players
Ukrainian expatriate sportspeople in Israel
Sportspeople from Kherson